Llanrumney United Football Club is a Welsh football team based in Llanrumney, Cardiff, Wales. They play in the South Wales Alliance League Premier Division, which is in the fourth tier of the Welsh football league system, having secured two promotions in two seasons.

History
The club was founded on 16 August 1996, and joined the South Wales Senior League Division Two, where they finished runners-up in their first season, and gained promotion to Division One.

In 2018–19 they were champions of Division Two of the South Wales Alliance League and gained promotion to Division One.

In the 2019–20 season they finished as runners-up and were promoted to the Premier Division for the 2020–21 season.

Honours
South Wales Alliance League Division One: – Runners-up: 2019–20
South Wales Alliance League Division Two – Winners: 2018–19
South Wales Senior League Cup – Champions: 2008–09
South Wales Senior League Division Two: – Runners-up: 1996–97; 2005–06

References

External links
Club official twitter
Club official facebook

Football clubs in Wales
South Wales Alliance League clubs
South Wales Senior League clubs
Association football clubs established in 1996
1996 establishments in Wales
Football clubs in Cardiff
Sport in Cardiff